The 1985 Michigan State Spartans football team represented Michigan State University in the 1985 Big Ten Conference football season. In their third season under head coach George Perles, the Spartans compiled a 7–5 overall record (5–3 against Big Ten opponents), finished in a tie for fourth place in the Big Ten Conference, and lost to Georgia Tech in the 1985 Hall of Fame Classic.

Six Spartans were recognized by the Associated Press (AP) and/or the United Press International (UPI) on the 1984 All-Big Ten Conference football team: running back Lorenzo White (AP-1; UPI-1); offensive guard John Wojciechowski (AP-1); offensive tackle Steve Bogdalek (AP-2); linebacker Shane Bullough (AP-2); defensive back Phil Parker (UPI-1); and punter Greg Montgomery (AP-1).

Schedule

Personnel

Game summaries

Arizona State

at Notre Dame

Western Michigan

at Iowa

    
    
    
    
    
    
    
    
    
    

Lorenzo White 39 Rush, 229 Yds, 2 TD

Michigan

On October 12, 1985, Michigan State lost to Michigan, 31–0, in front of a crowd of 78,235 at Spartan Stadium. The victory was regarded at the time as revenge for the Spartans' 19–7 upset of the Wolverines in 1984. Michigan struck early after Michigan State quarterback Bobby McAllister fumbled the snap on the second play of the game, Andy Moeller recovered the ball on the Spartans' 16-yard line, and Jim Harbaugh threw a touchdown pass to tight end Eric Kattus.  Less than two minutes after Michigan's first score, Dieter Heren blocked a Greg Montgomery punt, and Ed Hood recovered the ball in the end zone for Michigan's second touchdown. Harbaugh completed 13 of 23 passes, threw two touchdown passes to Kattus and gave up three interceptions. Jamie Morris rushed for 84 yards on 19 carries. Mike Gillette also kicked a field goal. On defense, Michigan held Lorenzo White (who set a Big Ten record with 2,066 yards in 1985) to a season-low 47 yards on 18 carries.  The Wolverines' defense also sacked Bobby McAllister three times, intercepted him once, and held him to 83 passing yards.

Illinois

at Purdue

Lorenzo White 53 Rush, 244 Yds

Minnesota

at Indiana
Lorenzo White 25 Rush, 286 Yds, 2 TD (played just over a half)

Northwestern

at Wisconsin
Lorenzo White 42 Rush, 223 Yds (set single season Big Ten rushing record)

Hall of Fame Classic

References

Michigan State
Michigan State Spartans football seasons
Michigan State Spartans football